Lesmone fufius is a species of moth in the family Erebidae. It is found in North America.

The MONA or Hodges number for Lesmone fufius is 8652.

References

Further reading

 
 
 

Omopterini